The Housing Shortage (German: Die Wohnungsnot) is a 1920 German silent short comedy film directed by Ernst Lubitsch and starring Victor Janson and Marga Köhler and Ossi Oswalda. It is now considered a lost film.

References

External links
 

1920 films
Films of the Weimar Republic
Films directed by Ernst Lubitsch
1920 comedy films
German comedy films
Lost German films
German black-and-white films
German silent short films
1920 lost films
1920 short films
Lost comedy films
Silent comedy films
1920s German films